The UNIFFAC  Women's Cup, also called Women's Challenge Cup, is an association football tournament for teams from Central African  organized by Central African Football Federations' Union (UNIFFAC).

Format

History

The first edition was played in Equatorial Guinea 2020 with five teams, which included some foreign-based players.

Results

Participating nations
Legend

 – Champions
 – Runners-up
 – Third place
 – Fourth place
 – Losing semi-finals
QF – Quarter-finals
GS – Group stage

Q — Qualified for upcoming tournament
 – Did not qualify
 – Withdrew
 – Hosts

Notes and references

External links

 
UNIFFAC competitions